Adelswärd may refer to:

Adelswärd (baronial family), Swedish family descended from the Hultman line of the extinct titled family Adelswärd
Adelswärd (comital family), descended from the baronial family Adelswärd
Adelswärd (noble family), Swedish family which consists of two lines, related through female line
Jacques d'Adelswärd-Fersen (1880–1923), French novelist and poet